Ingeborg is a Germanic feminine given name, mostly used in Germany, Denmark, Sweden and Norway, derived from Old Norse Ingiborg, Ingibjǫrg, combining the theonym Ing with the element borg "stronghold, protection". Ingebjørg is the Norwegian most used variant of the name, and Ingibjörg is the Icelandic variant.

People

Pre-modern era
Ordered chronologically
 Ingeborg, 10th century mother of Ragnvald Ulfsson
 Ingeborg Tryggvasdotter (10th-11th century), daughter of Tryggve Olafsson (died 963), granddaughter of Harald Fairhair and sister of Olaf I of Norway
 Ingeborg of Kiev, mother of Valdemar I of Denmark
 Ingeborg of Denmark, Queen of France (1174-1237), wife of Philip II of France and daughter of Valdemar I of Denmark
 Ingeborg Eriksdotter of Sweden (c. 1212-c. 1254), daughter of Eric X of Sweden, wife of Birger jarl and mother of Valdemar I of Sweden
 Ingeborg of Kalundborg (died 1267), influential Danish noble
 Ingeborg of Denmark, Queen of Norway (c. 1244–1287), wife of Magnus VI and daughter of Eric IV
 Ingeborg Birgersdotter of Bjelbo (c. 1253-1302), duchess consort of Saxony
 Ingeborg of Sweden (1263–1292), Swedish princess and countess consort
 Ingeborg Magnusdotter of Sweden (1277-1319), Swedish princess and Queen of Denmark
 Ingeborg Eriksdottir of Norway (1297-1357), Norwegian princess and Swedish royal duchess
 Ingeborg of Mecklenburg (1343/45-1395), electress consort of Brandenburg and Countess of Holstein-Rendsburg, daughter of Albert II, Duke of Mecklenburg and his wife, Euphemia of Sweden
 Ingeborg of Norway (1301-1361), Norwegian duchess, Swedish royal duchess and sometime regent of Norway and Sweden
 Ingeborg of Denmark, Duchess of Mecklenburg (1347-1370), wife of Henry III, Duke of Mecklenburg, daughter of Valdemar IV of Denmark
 Ingeborg of Holstein (1396-1465), Swedish Roman Catholic Abbess of Vadstena Abbey
 Ingeborg Tott (died 1507), consort of the Swedish regent Sten Sture the elder

Modern era
Ordered alphabetically by last name
 Princess Ingeborg of Denmark (1878-1958), Swedish princess, daughter of Frederick VIII of Denmark, wife of Charles of Sweden, Duke of Västergötland
 Ingeborg Akeleye (1741-1800), Norwegian noblewoman and heiress
 Ingeborg Bachmann (1927-1973), Austrian poet and author
 Ingeborg Beling (1904-1988), German ethologist and chronobiologist
 Ingeborg Brams (1921-1989), Danish actress
 Ingeborg Bruhn Bertelsen (1894–1977), Danish actress
 Ingeborg Danz (born 1961), German opera singer
 Ingeborg Drewitz (1923-1986), German writer
 Ingeborga Dapkūnaitė (born 1963), Lithuanian actress
 Ingeborg Fülepp, Croatian artist
 Ingeborg Gjærum (born 1985), Norwegian environmentalist
 Ingeborg Grässle (born 1961), German politician and Member of the European Parliament
 Ingeborg Hallstein (born 1936), German opera singer
 Ingeborg Hansen (1886-1954), Danish lawyer and politician
 Ingeborg Hochmair (born 1953), Austrian electrical engineer, inventor and entrepreneur
 Ingeborg Hunzinger (1915-2009), German sculptor
 Inge King (1915-2016), German-born Australian sculptor
 Ingeborg Lüscher (born 1936), German/Swiss multi-media artist
 Ingeborg Mello (1919-2009), Argentine track and field athlete, primarily in the discus and shot put
 Ingeborg i Mjärhult (1665-1749), Swedish natural healer, soothsayer and spiritual visionary
 Ingeborg Møller (1878-1964), Norwegian playwright, novelist and biographer
 Ingeborg Nyberg (born 1940), Swedish singer and actress
 Ingeborg Pfüller (born 1932), Argentine discus thrower
 Ingeborg Rapoport (1912-2017), German pediatrician, the oldest person to receive a PhD at age 102
 Ingeborg Refling Hagen (1895-1989), Norwegian author and teacher
 Ingeborg Reichelt (born 1928), German soprano
 Ingeborg Bronsart von Schellendorf (1840-1913), Swedish-German composer born Ingeborg Starck
 Ingeborg Schmitz (born 1922), German Olympic swimmer
 Ingeborg Schwenzer (born 1951), German jurist and law professor
 Ingeborg Schöner (born 1935), German actress
 Ingeborg (singer), Belgian singer and television presenter Ingeborg Sergeant
 Ingeborg Sjöqvist (1912-2015), Swedish diver
 Ingeborg Sørensen (born 1948), Norwegian model and Playboy Playmate of the Month for March 1975
 Ingeborg Spangsfeldt (1895-1968), Danish film actress of the 1910s and '20s

Legendary characters
 Hjalmar and Ingeborg, Swedish lovers in Norse mythology
 The beloved of Frithiof in Frithiof's Saga
 The daughter of the Swedish King Eysteinn Beli, betrothed to Ragnar Lodbrok

References

Scandinavian feminine given names
Danish feminine given names
German feminine given names
Norwegian feminine given names
Swedish feminine given names